Satta is a 2004 Indian Telugu-language action drama film directed by Pavan starring Sai Kiran, Madhurima and Kota Srinivasa Rao. The film is a remake of the Hollywood film Heist (2001).

Cast 
Sai Kiran as Chakravarthy 
Madhurima as Madhu
Kota Srinivasa Rao as MLA Samba Siva Rao
Costumes Krishna as a minister

Soundtrack 
Music by Suresh. The film's audio launch was held on 28 November 2003.

Reception 
Jeevi of Idlebrain.com rated the film two out of five and said that "'Satta' is a below-average action oriented mass film". A critic from Sify said that "There are no redeeming factors and technically the film is below average. Most of the time the makers resorts to cliched and slapdash action". Mithun Verma of Full Hyderabad said that "Sai Kiran is not too bad as an actor. Kota has habitually outperformed everybody and everything in the movie. But the script and direction just will not allow him or any other force to make this one look good".

References 

Indian crime drama films
Indian heist films
2000s Telugu-language films
2000s heist films
Films about con artists